Par Avion is the second EP released by Christian rock band High Flight Society. It was released on June 16, 2009. This EP is also the band's first work to be released independently, and to feature Jerad Griffin on the rhythm guitar and background vocals.

Critical reception 
According to Roger Gelwicks of Jesus Freak Hideout, "It's hard to find much wrong with this EP, as pretty much everything is musically and lyrically solid."

Track listing

Personnel 
 Jason Wilkes – lead vocals
 Jerad Griffin – backing vocals, rhythm guitar
 Michael Packer – backing vocals, lead guitar
 John Packer – backing vocals, bass guitar
 Scotty Lockridge – drums, percussion

References 

2009 EPs
High Flight Society albums